Harrier Attack (stylized as Harrier Attack!) is a horizontally scrolling shooter released for the Oric 1 and ZX Spectrum in 1983 by Durell Software. Ports for the Amstrad CPC and Commodore 64 were published in 1984.

Gameplay
The player controls a Sea Harrier fighter, looking sideways onto a right-to-left scrolling seascape and landscape. The aim of the game is to take off from a carrier, attack ships and land targets, avoid the occasional missile and enemy fighter, then land back on the carrier again. Although the game was a work of fiction, it was inspired by the 1982 Falklands War, in which the Sea Harrier had played a major role.

Reception

References

External links

1983 video games
Amstrad CPC games
Commodore 64 games
Oric games
Horizontally scrolling shooters
Video games developed in the United Kingdom
ZX Spectrum games
Falklands War video games
Aircraft carriers in fiction
Durell Software games
Single-player video games